thumb|A Belgian shop with 250 different kinds of beer.

Belgian beer culture includes traditions of craftsmanship for brewing beer and is part of the diet and social life of Belgians. Its cultural value was formally recognised in 2016 when it was added to UNESCO's "Intangible Cultural Heritage of Humanity" list.

Background
The range of traditional Belgian beer available is due to a variety of brewing processes, methods of fermentation, the use of yeasts and other ingredients, and traditional knowledge passed through families and breweries for centuries. This results in beers of different colours and textures. While Belgium beer production is less than one percent of world beer production, and there are fewer breweries in Belgium than in some states of the US, Belgium has more diversity in beer styles than any beer-producing region.  

Many local Belgian beers are brewed in micro-breweries. These operations range from small-scale micro-breweries run by individuals or small amateur clubs that produce less than 10 hectolitres per year to larger commercial operations that produce thousands of hectolitres of beer annually. There are also beer firms that commercialise beer (sometimes with their own recipes) under their own brand, and local brewers who brew for them as Etiket or 'contractors'. There are some large breweries and two global players with Inbev (formerly Interbrew/Stella Artois) and Alken-Maes (Heineken Group). A large quantity of beer is produced in Belgium for export. In 2016, a total of 20,600,000 hL (2.06 million L) was produced which is higher than the 19,811,000 hL produced in 2015. In 2016, a total of 14,100,000 hL (1.41 million L) was exported globally, an increase from the 13,025,000 hL exported in 2015. In contrast to the growth of beer production and export, beer consumption in Belgium has declined. In 2016 beer consumption  dropped 3.3% from 7,950,000 hL to 7,700,000 hL. Belgium ranks 15th in consumption of beer per capita in Europe. 

Belgians consume a large quantity of beer in a wide variety of brands. There are over 800 varieties of beer brewed in Belgium, and all are in high demand. In 2016, a total of 7,689,148 hL (768.91 million L) of beer was consumed, which is 70-75L of beer per capita.

Beer consumption in Belgium is a social event, both in private and in public. People offer beer to guests in their homes or enjoy beer with friends at a pub or restaurant. Most everyday activities either start or end with a beer. Although the number of pubs in Belgium has been declining over the last few decades, every village has at least one local café. In the early 20th century, Belgium had over 3,000 breweries and more than 200,000 cafés—a café for every five houses. The number of cafés, bistros, taverns, and café-restaurants has since declined; at the end of 2005, Belgium (10 mi inhabitants, 30,000km2) counted 19,300 establishments that were listed as cafés (down from 25,500 in 1998). According to a 2016 sector survey, Belgium has 57,500 hotel, restaurant, and café enterprises, with over 80,000 outlets; about 37,500 of these are categorised as restaurants.

Belgian beer culture is most visible in the diversity of beer offered in every pub. A typical beer menu offers at least half a dozen draught beers and two dozen bottled beers of different types. Some degustation cafés will offer over 100 different beers and more than a dozen draught beers. Degustation cafés also offer tastings for parties of four or more. A party of four can order four beers and get 16 glasses to share, so each member can taste 1/4 of each beer. In addition, Belgium has specific beer supermarkets offering a wide variety of beer from multiple producers. Many restaurants offer beer on their menu cards or operate as cafe and restaurants.

The market share of specialty beers in the Belgian market rose in the period between 1990 and 2013 from 10% to 30%. The number of beer varieties has increased from 750 to over 1,600.

Intangible Cultural Heritage
Flemish Minister Joke Schauvliege added Belgian beer culture to the Flemish Heritage Inventory.

On 30 November 2016, it was announced that Belgian beer culture had been added to the UNESCO Intangible Cultural Heritage Lists.

Beer culture

Brewing and tradition
Beer is a part of everyday life in Belgium. Until the 1960s, children eating lunch at school could choose from tea, coffee, or beer (the so-called "table beer", blond or sour-brown, which is very low in alcohol). In the 1980s at university restaurants, drink choices were still water and table beer; soft drinks were introduced in the mid-1970s. Most weeks there is a beer festival somewhere in the country, attracting thousands of visitors. Some festivals have an international reputation, whereas others simply celebrate a local village beer. 

Besides omnipresent beer, cafés, breweries, and brewing fanatics, there are also several beer museums to be found across the country. Each  showcases a different aspect of Belgian beer culture, and each one takes its own unique approach. While some focus on hops and others on transport or history, all of the beer museums in Belgium share one thing in common—they are run by true beer-lovers committed to their passion for Belgian beer. Beer culture is a prominent part of Belgium's history and its folklore. Belgians' love for beer has left a mark in their history books and has created legends that live on today. One legend says that St. Gambrinus, the 'saint of beer', who is said to have introduced hops, is buried in Brussels only meters away from the Brewers House on the Grand Place.

St. Gambrinus or Arnold of Soissons
The legend of St. Gambrinus seems to go back to John I, Duke of Brabant (c. 1252–1294), John the Fearless, Duke of Burgundy (1371–1419) and was written down from the oral tradition by Bavarian historiographer Johannes Aventinus. John I's dukedom, the Duchy of Brabant, was a wealthy beer-producing area. The brewers' guild in Brussels made the Duke an honorary member and hung his portrait in their meeting hall. In his 1874 monograph on Gambrinus, Victor Coremans reported that references to Brabant and Flanders in the Gambrinus legends seemed recent, but a similarity between the likeness of John I on his tomb and the faces in some illustrations was remarkable. Moreover, the Saint's name seems to have a hypothetical connection: John I was sometimes known as Jan Primus, and Gambrinus might be a corruption of the duke's name. 

The real patron saint of hop-pickers and brewers is Arnold Bishop of Soisson (ca 1040–1087), the founder of the Abbey of St. Peter in Oudenburg. In Oudenburg, the friars brewed beer, a vital product in medieval life. Arnold allegedly encouraged the local peasants to drink beer, instead of water, due to its 'gift of health'. During one outbreak of illness, which caused many deaths among the population, Arnold advised the local people to avoid consuming water in favour of beer, which saved many lives.

History
These legends demonstrate that brewing in this part of the world goes back a very long time; traces have been found before the pre-Roman era in locations connected to the Celts. The history of beer in the nation of the Belgae is well documented from the Gallo-Roman era (3rd-4th century AD) when brewing was very much a women's craft. Traces of domestic brewing activity have been found in the remains of Roman villas in Ronchinne, Anthée, and Mette. In the Middle Ages, Gruut or Gruit was a fundamental part of the brewing process. This is reflected in family names like Gruuthuse, of the Gruuthusemuseum in Bruges.

In abbeys, the quality of beer was improved by adding hops. Hops were gradually used more often as brewers discovered they prevented the beer from souring. The German abbess Hildegard von Bingen provided a detailed description of the workings of hops in the 12th century. Others took different brewing paths. In the Pajottenland region, beers were brewed using wild yeasts and a spontaneous fermentation process, a process particular to the valley of the Zenne, which resulted in Lambic type beers.

As in the rest of Europe, beer was seen as a healthy alternative to water. It is estimated daily beer consumption in medieval Europe reached as much as 1.5L per capita.

During the reign of Joseph II, Holy Roman Emperor—and later under Napoleon—most abbeys and nunneries were abolished, and the brewing cauldrons disappeared. Now one can only find authentic brewing monks within the Trappist orders, of which six are found in Belgium. In contrast to abbey beers, Trappist beers are only brewed within the walls of the abbey.

See also
Beer in Belgium
List of Belgian beers

References

External links
 Belgische-bieren.be
 BelgischeBieren.eu
 Bierkonvent.be
 Website van Belgische familiale brouwerijen

Belgian culture
Beer in Belgium